David Tobias Nreca-Bisinger (born 18 January 2002) is a Kosovan professional footballer who plays as a goalkeeper for German club Stuttgarter Kickers.

Club career

Early career
Nreca-Bisinger at the age of 5, he started playing football as forward in SG Eintracht Sirnau, where after five years it was transferred to FSV Waiblingen. He was 12 years old in 2014, when the coach during a tournament switched the playing position of Nreca-Bisinger from forward to goalkeeper, which resulted with success after was declared being the best goalkeeper of that tournament. Nreca-Bisinger besides being was part of FSV Waiblingen, he was part even of FC Esslingen (2014–2016) and VfB Stuttgart (2016–2018).

Sonnenhof Großaspach
On 1 July 2018, Nreca-Bisinger joined with youth team of Sonnenhof Großaspach. On 16 April 2019, he signed his first professional contract with first team of Sonnenhof Großaspach after agreeing to a two-year deal. On 4 July 2020, Nreca-Bisinger made his debut as professional footballer in a 1–0 away defeat against Carl Zeiss Jena after being named in the starting line-up.

International career

Under-17
In July 2018, Nreca-Bisinger received a call-up from Kosovo U17 for a gathering with footballers from Kosovan diaspora. After three months, he was named as part of the Kosovo U17 squad for 2019 UEFA European Under-17 Championship qualifications. On 26 October 2018, Nreca-Bisinger made his debut with Kosovo U17 in a 2019 UEFA European Under-17 Championship qualifications match against Scotland U17 after being named in the starting line-up.

Under-21
On 2 October 2020, Nreca-Bisinger received a call-up from Kosovo U21 for a 2021 UEFA European Under-21 Championship qualification matches against Austria U21 and Andorra U21. On 13 October 2020, he made his debut with Kosovo U21 in a match against Andorra U21 after being named in the starting line-up.

Personal life
Nreca-Bisinger was born in Gjakova, Kosovo to a Kosovo Albanian divorced mother, he as a two-year-old and his mother moved to Esslingen am Neckar, Germany and after her marriage to a German, in addition to the surname Nreca he also took the surname of his stepfather, Bisinger, making the surname Nreca-Bisinger.

Career statistics

Club

References

External links

2002 births
Living people
Sportspeople from Gjakova
Kosovan footballers
Kosovo youth international footballers
Kosovo under-21 international footballers
German footballers
German people of Kosovan descent
German people of Albanian descent
Association football goalkeepers
3. Liga players
Regionalliga players
SG Sonnenhof Großaspach players